This list includes all gazetted rocks, boulders, pinnacles, crags, needles, pillars, rock formations, and tors in Western Australia, both inland and offshore. It does not include monoliths gazetted as mounts or hills, such as Mount Augustus.

The list is complete with respect to the 1996 Gazetteer of Australia. Dubious names have been checked against the online 2004 data, and in all cases confirmed correct. However, if any rocks have been gazetted or deleted since 1996, this list does not reflect these changes. Strictly speaking, Australian place names are gazetted in capital letters only; the names in this list have been converted to mixed case in accordance with normal capitalisation conventions. Locations are as gazetted; some large rock formations may extend over large areas.

See List of rocks in Western Australia for more.



L

M

N

See also
Geography of Western Australia
Granite outcrops of Western Australia
List of rocks in Western Australia, A-B, plus numerals
List of rocks in Western Australia, C-E
List of rocks in Western Australia, F-K
List of rocks in Western Australia, O-S
List of rocks in Western Australia, T-Z

References

Lists of places in Australia
Rocks, L-N
Rocks, L-N
Lists of coordinates